Dysfunction can refer to:
 Abnormality (behavior)
 Dysfunctional family
 Sexual dysfunction 
 Dysfunction (album), an album by the rock band Staind
 Manifest and latent functions and dysfunctions (sociological theory)
Measurement dysfunction

See also
 Malfunction (disambiguation)